Smith's earth snake (Uropeltis grandis),  also known commonly as the violet shieldtail, is a species of nonvenomous snake in the family Uropeltidae. The species is endemic to India.

Geographic range
U. grandis is found in the Anaimalai Hills of Kerala, southern India.

Taxonomy
U. grandis had been classified in the past as Rhinophis grandis Beddome, Silybura grandis (Beddome), and Uropeltis grandis (Beddome). In 1966 Carl Gans renamed this species Uropeltis smithi in honor of American herpetologist Hobart M. Smith.

Description
Smith's earth snake, like all shieldtail snakes, has a characteristic pointed head and flattened tail.

The dorsum is dark violet. The venter is dark violet with alternating large yellow spots or crossbands.

Adults may attain  in total length (including tail).

The smooth dorsal scales are arranged in 19 rows at midbody (in 21 rows behind the head). The ventrals number 198-218; and the subcaudals number 6-12.

The snout is pointed. The rostral is ⅓ or ¼ the length of the shielded part of the head. The portion of the rostral visible from above is longer than its distance from the frontal. The nasals are either in contact with each other behind the rostral, or separated from each other by the rostral. The frontal is longer than broad. The eye is very small, its diameter less than ½ the length of the ocular shield. The diameter of the body goes 30 to 40 times into the total length. The ventrals are about two times as large as the contiguous scales, and are pluricarinate posteriorly in males. The tail is round or slightly laterally compressed, and the dorsal scales of the tail are strongly pluricarinate. The terminal scute has two small spines.

Habitat

Reproduction
U. grandis is viviparous.

References

Further reading

Beddome RH (1867). "Descriptions and figures of Five New Snakes from the Madras Presidency". Madras Quart. J. Med. Sci. 11: 14-16. (Rhinophis grandis, new species). [Reprint: (1940). J. Soc. Bibliogr. Nat. Sci., London 1 (10): 315- 317.]
Beddome RH (1886). "An Account of the Earth-Snakes of the Peninsula of India and Ceylon". Ann. Mag. Nat. Hist., Fifth Series 17: 3-33. (Silybura grandis, new combination, p. 11).
Gans, Carl (1966). "Liste der rezenten Amphibien und Reptilien. Uropeltidae ". Das Tierreich 84: 1-29. (Uropeltis smithi, new name). (in German).
Smith MA (1943). The Fauna of British India, Ceylon and Burma, Including the Whole of the Indo-Chinese Sub-region. Reptilia and Amphibia. Vol. III.—Serpentes. London: Secretary of State for India. (Taylor and Francis, printers). xii + 583 pp. (Uropeltis grandis, new combination, pp. 85–86, Figures 25A, 25B, 25C).

Uropeltidae
Reptiles of India
Endemic fauna of the Western Ghats
Reptiles described in 1867
Taxa named by Richard Henry Beddome